Julian Eligiusz Aleksandrovich Michaux (1 December 1867 – 11 December 1925), born in Warsaw, Congress Poland, was a polish fencer. He competed in the individual masters sabre event at the 1900 Summer Olympics, representing the Russian Empire, where he finished 5th. His greatgrandfather in the beginning of the 19th century came from Liège, now part of Belgium, to Warsaw - thus the french family name.

References

External links
 

1867 births
1925 deaths
Male fencers from the Russian Empire
Fencers at the 1900 Summer Olympics
Polish sports coaches
Burials at Powązki Cemetery
Polish Army officers
Fencers from Warsaw
People from Warsaw Governorate